Jaki Whitren (1954 – November 24, 2016) was a British singer-songwriter. Her debut album, Raw But Tender (1973), featuring the single "Give Her The Day" which received some airplay on BBC Radio 1, was recorded when she was 19 years old. It was a mix of blues, folk and rock, and she also played guitar and banjo. She played a tour, supporting John McLaughlin's Mahavishnu Orchestra. She also contributed to the Alan Parsons Project's release in 1977, I Robot.

In later years, she devoted herself to her personal and musical relationship with husband and fellow musician John Cartwright, in a more avant-garde jazz direction. Her only other album was the self-released Isis Unveiled. She died of cancer shortly after his death from a heart attack.

Discography
 Jaki Whitren – Raw But Tender (Epic, 1973)
 Jaki Whitren + John Cartwright – Rhythm Hymn (Elektra, 1982)
 Jaki Whitren & John Cartwright – International Times (Living, 1983)
 Court of Miracles – featuring Jaki Whitren & John Cartwright – Miracle Style (ACT, 1997)
 Jaki Whitren – Isis Unveiled (self released, 2007)

References

1954 births
Living people
British folk singers
British blues singers
British women pop singers
British jazz singers
British rock singers
Place of birth missing (living people)